Grégory Thil (born 15 March 1980) is a French former professional footballer who played as a forward. He played at a professional level for Beauvais, Boulogne, Dijon, and Châteauroux, and is the all-time leading scorer for Boulogne.

Career
Born in Creil, Thil began his career at Beauvais. In 2005, he moved to the French side Boulogne, then playing in Ligue 2, and was handed the number 10 shirt. He spent his career playing for Boulogne over the six years, making 165 appearances with 79 goals.

On 1 June 2011, Thil moved to the newly promoted Ligue 1 side Dijon. In July 2014, he was loaned to Châteauroux.

In 2015, Thil returned to Boulogne. He scored well over 100 goals in his career with Boulogne, making him the club's all time leading goal scorer.

On 13 June 2019, Thil joined Racing Besançon.

Career statistics

References

External links
 
 

Living people
1980 births
People from Creil
Sportspeople from Oise
French footballers
Association football forwards
AS Beauvais Oise players
US Boulogne players
Dijon FCO players
LB Châteauroux players
Jura Sud Foot players
Racing Besançon players
Ligue 1 players
Ligue 2 players
Championnat National players
Championnat National 2 players
Championnat National 3 players
Footballers from Hauts-de-France